The Type system is a classification system used by the British Royal Navy to classify surface escorts by function. The system evolved in the early 1950s, when the Royal Navy was experimenting with building single-purpose escort vessels with specific roles in light of experience gained in World War II. The original (July 1950) numbering scheme was:

Type 1X were Anti-Submarine (ASW) frigates (when the numbers ran out in the 1960s, ASW frigates continued as the Type 2X series).

Type 3X were General-Purpose (GP) frigates (Chosen 2015)
Type 4X were Anti-Aircraft (AAW) frigates (this later evolved into the "Destroyer" Type series).
Type 6X were Aircraft-Direction (ADW) frigates.
Type 8X were multi-role ships. An Admiralty Fleet Order defined these ships as "destroyers" if they could achieve "fleet speed" or as "sloops" if they could not.

Types 11-30, anti-submarine frigates
 Type 11 : Diesel powered anti-submarine frigate based on hull of Type 41 / 61. Not built.
 Type 12 Whitby-class : Steam powered, high-speed "first-rate" anti-submarine frigate.
 Type 12M Rothesay-class : Modified Type 12 design.
 Type 12I Leander : Improved Type 12, general purpose frigate.
 Type 14 Blackwood : Steam powered, high-speed, "second-rate" anti-submarine frigate. 
 Type 15 : High-speed anti submarine frigate, produced by full conversion of wartime built destroyers of the R-, T-, U- and V- and W and Z-classes.
 Type 16 : High-speed anti submarine frigate, produced by a limited conversion of wartime T-class (7 ships), O- and P-class (3) destroyers.
 Type 17 : "Third-rate" anti-submarine frigate, analogous to wartime corvettes. Design abandoned in 1953 and not built.
 Type 18 : High-speed anti submarine frigate, intermediate conversion of wartime destroyer hulls of the N-, S-, T and Z- classes (and intended to replace the Type 16). Design abandoned in 1953 and not built.
 Type 19 : Very high speed (42 knot) gas turbine powered anti-submarine frigate. Design abandoned in 1965. Not built.
 Type 21 Amazon-class: General purpose, gas-turbine powered commercially designed frigate. 
 Type 22 Broadsword-class : Large, gas-turbine powered, anti-submarine frigates.
  Type 23 Duke-class : Gas-turbine and diesel powered, anti-submarine frigates. Smaller and less expensive than the Type 22, with similar capabilities. 16 built.
 Type 24 : Cheap frigate design ("Future Light Frigate") intended for export. In RN service would have served as a towed array ASW ship. Not built.
 Type 25 : More capable development of the Type 24, designed to have almost the capability of a Type 22 but at only three-quarters of the cost. Much of the thinking, including the diesel-electric machinery, went into the Type 23. Not built.
 Type 26 : "Global Combat Ship" : First announced in March 2010, and formerly known as the Future Surface Combatant. Initial orders placed in February 2014.

Types 31-40, general purpose frigates
 Type 31 : The Type 31 frigate is the proposed General Purpose frigate as set out in the Strategic Defence and Security Review 2015.
 Type 32 : The Type 32 frigate was mentioned in November 2020 as a future frigate.

Types 41-60, anti-aircraft frigates/destroyers
 Type 41 Leopard-class frigate : Diesel powered anti-aircraft frigate built on common hull with Type 61.
 Type 42(i) East coast frigate : High speed coastal escort. Not built
 Type 42 destroyer (ii) Sheffield-class : Gas-turbine powered, fleet area-defence anti-aircraft destroyer.
 Type 43 destroyer : Large gas-turbine powered, "double-ended" (Sea Dart launchers fore and aft), fleet area-defence anti-aircraft destroyer. Project cancelled in 1981 with none built.
 Type 44 destroyer : A smaller version of the Type 43 with better anti-submarine capability. Cancelled.
 Type 45 destroyer Daring-class : Fleet area-defence anti-aircraft destroyer to replace Type 44 project. 6 built.

Types 61-80, aircraft direction frigates
 Type 61 Salisbury-class : Diesel powered aircraft-direction frigate built on common hull with Type 41.
 Type 62 : Proposed high-speed aircraft-direction frigate, to be built by full conversion of five remaining ships of the M-class destroyers and seven War Emergency Programme destroyers. Not built.

Types 81-99, general purpose frigates/destroyers/sloops
 Type 81 Tribal-class frigate : Single-shaft steam / gas-turbine powered general purpose "colonial" frigates. Originally sloops reclassified as "second class" general-purpose frigates in 1960s.
 Type 82 destroyer : Large steam / gas-turbine powered fleet anti-aircraft and anti-submarine destroyer to replace County-class destroyers and escort CVA-01 aircraft carriers. Cancelled along with carriers. Only HMS Bristol (D23) was built of the four planned.
  Type 83: proposed in the 2021 Defence Command Paper as the successor to the Type 45 Destroyer entering service in the late 2030s.

See also
Naming conventions for destroyers of the Royal Navy - describing the various conventions used to name destroyer classes of the Royal Navy since 1913.
Rating system of the Royal Navy - the system used to classify ships of the line during the age of sail. The "rating" system was briefly revived to further classify anti-submarine escorts during the 1950s.

Notes

References

Royal Navy
 
 
Ship naming conventions